is a 2018 television anime series by White Fox, based on the 5pb. 2015 Steins;Gate 0 video game. As a sequel to the Steins;Gate visual novel game, and the 2011 anime adaptation, this series takes place in an alternate future timeline that forks off from the original series' ending. Rintaro Okabe, who had become traumatized into inaction over his time travel troubles, chose to remain in a world where Kurisu Makise is dead. After meeting scientist Maho Hiyajo, Rintaro is introduced to an AI system called Amadeus, which is based on Kurisu's personality and digitally preserved memories that were downloaded before her death.

The series aired in Japan between April 12 and September 27, 2018, with a bonus episode released on December 21, 2018. It was simulcast by Crunchyroll and Aniplus Asia, with a dubbed English version streamed by Funimation. The ending theme for episodes 2-7, 9-11 and 13 is "Last Game" by Zwei. Episode 8 featured an insert song "Lyra" by Zwei. The ending theme for episode 12 is "Hoshi no Kanaderu Uta" performed by Megumi Han. The ending theme from episode 14-22 is "World-Line" by Asami Imai. The final episode featured an insert song "Gate of Steiner" by Eri Sasaki.



Episode list

Notes

References

External links
  

Lists of anime episodes
Science Adventure